À gogo or -a-go-go may refer to:

A Go Go (John Scofield album), a 1998 album by John Scofield
A Go Go (Potshot album), a 2002 album by Potshot
Agogo (album), a 1998 album by KMFDM

See also

Agogo (disambiguation)
Au Go Go Records, Melbourne, Australia based independent record label
Go go (disambiguation)
Agogô, a musical instrument